Alec Mango (16 March 1911 – 7 November 1989) was an English actor. He is best known for portraying El Supremo in the 1951 Captain Horatio Hornblower, he also appeared in South of Algiers (1953), The Strange World of Planet X (1958), The 7th Voyage of Sinbad (1958), Danger Man (1961), and Frankenstein Created Woman (1967). He also appeared in the TV series, The Adventures of Robin Hood. One of his last TV appearances was Channel 4's TV Movie The Gourmet as Rossi on 4th of January 1987.

Partial filmography

 Fiddlers Three (1944) - Secretary (uncredited)
 Snowbound (1948) - Italian Girl's Boyfriend (uncredited)
 Captain Horatio Hornblower (1951) - El Supremo 
 His Excellency (1952) - Jackie
 South of Algiers (1953) - Mahmoud
 They Who Dare (1954) - Patroklis
 Up to His Neck (1954) - Bandit General
 Mask of Dust (1954) - Guido Rosetti
 Lust for Life (1956) - Dr. Rey (uncredited)
 Zarak (1956) - Akbar (merchant)
 Interpol (1957) - Salko
 The Shiralee (1957) - Papadoulos
 The Strange World of Planet X (1958) - Dr. Laird
 The Man Inside (1958) - Lopez
 The 7th Voyage of Sinbad (1958) - Caliph
 The Angry Hills (1959) - Phillibos
 The 3 Worlds of Gulliver (1960) - Minister of Lilliput
 A Story of David (1961) - Kudruh
 We Shall See, (Edgar Wallace Mysteries) (1964) - Ludo
 Khartoum (1966) - Bordeini Bey (uncredited)
 Frankenstein Created Woman (1967) - Spokesman
 Some May Live (1967) - Ducrai
 Steptoe and Son (1972) - Hotel Doctor
 The Playbirds (1978) - Ransome
 Confessions from the David Galaxy Affair (1979) - Pembleton
 Lion of the Desert (1980)
 Gothic (1986) - Murray (final film role)

References

External links

1911 births
1989 deaths
English male stage actors
English male film actors
English male television actors
Male actors from London
People from Paddington
20th-century English male actors